Ambazhathil Karunakaran Lohithadas (10 May 1955 – 28 June 2009) was an Indian screenwriter, playwright, film maker, and producer who worked in the Malayalam film industry. In a career spanning over two decades, his films have won a National Film Award, six Kerala State Film Awards, and fourteen Kerala Film Critics Award for Best Script.

Lohithadas made his debut as a screenwriter with Thaniyavarthanam (1987). He has written screenplays for 35 films in a 24-year-long career, such as Vicharana (1988), Ezhuthapurangal (1988), Kireedam (1989), Dasharatham (1989), Mrugaya (1989), His Highness Abdullah (1990), Sasneham (1990), Bharatham (1991), Amaram (1991), Aadhaaram (1992), Kamaladalam (1992), Vatsalyam (1993), Venkalam (1993), Padheyam (1993), Chenkol (1993), Chakoram (1994), Thooval Kottaram (1996), Sallapam (1996), and Veendum Chila Veettukaryangal (1999). He later became a director, and made his directorial debut with Bhoothakkannadi (1997). He later wrote and directed Karunyam (1997), Kanmadam (1998), Joker (2000), and Kasthooriman (2003). He died on 28 June 2009 due to a heart attack.

Early life 
Lohithadas (or 'Lohi', as he is often referred to) was born on 5 May 1955 in Chalakudy, Thrissur district, Kerala, as the son of late Ambazhathuparambil Karunakaran and late Lakshmi.

Career 
Lohi's first movie screenplay was Thaniavarthanam directed by "Sibi Malayil". Together, Sibi Malayil and Lohithadas would later produce several Malayalam movies. His screenplay works for Sibi Malayil are Thaniyavarthanam (1987), Dasharatham (1989), Kireedam (1989), His Highness Abdullah (1990), Bharatham (1990), Dhanam (1991), Kamaladalam (1992), and Chenkol (1993). Other works include Veendum Chila Veettukaryangal (1999), Sasneham (1990) for Sathyan Anthikkad and Amaram, Venkalam(1991) for Bharathan.

He later became a filmmaker and made works such as Bhoothakkannadi (1997), Karunyam (1997), Kanmadam (1998), Arayannangalude Veedu (2000), Joker (2000), Kasthooriman (2003) (which he himself produced), and Nivedyam (2007).
Most of his works were critically and commercially successful. His works were recognised from his very first venture Thaniyavarthanam, which brought him the Kerala State Film Award for Best Story.

"Nizhalukal Inachernna Naattuvazhikal" ('നിഴലുകൾ ഇണചേർന്ന നാട്ടുവഴികൾ' – എം. ശബരീഷ്, പാപ്പാത്തി ബുക്സ്) is a book about his life and film career.

Death 
On 28 June 2009, he died from a heart attack. His body was taken to his home in Lakkidi in Palakkad district, where he was cremated with full state honours.

Awards

 National Film Awards

 1998 – Indira Gandhi Award for Best Debut Film of a Director – Bhoothakannadi

 Kerala State Film Awards

 1987 – Best Story – Thaniyavarthanam
 1997 – Best Film – Bhoothakannadi
 1997 – Best Screen Play – Bhoothakkannadi

 Tamil Nadu State Film Awards

 2005 – Tamil Nadu State Film Award for Best Film Portraying Woman in Good Light – Kasthuri Maan

 Kerala Film Critics Association Awards
 1989 – Best Screenplay – Dasharatham
 1991 – Best Screenplay – Bharatham
 1996 – Best Screenplay – Sallapam, Thooval Kottaram
 1997 – Second Best Film – Bhoothakkannadi
 1997 – Best Story – Bhoothakkannadi
 1998 – Second Best Film – Ormacheppu
 1998 – Best Screenplay – Ormacheppu
 1998 – Second Best Film – Nivedyam
 1999 – Best Screenplay – Veendum Chila Veettukaryangal
 2003 – Second Best Film – Kasthooriman

 Asianet Film Award
 1999 – Best Script Writer Award – Veendum Chila Veettu Karyangal

Filmography

Screenwriter

Director

Actor

References

External links

 'Cinema of Malayalam' profile
 

1955 births
2009 deaths
People from Chalakudy
Malayalam film directors
Tamil film directors
Kerala State Film Award winners
Malayalam screenwriters
Male actors in Malayalam cinema
Indian male film actors
20th-century Indian film directors
21st-century Indian film directors
21st-century Indian dramatists and playwrights
20th-century Indian dramatists and playwrights
Film directors from Kerala
Screenwriters from Kerala
Tamil Nadu State Film Awards winners
Director whose film won the Best Debut Feature Film National Film Award
20th-century Indian screenwriters
Male actors from Thrissur